Brenno Ambrosini is an Italian pianist, born in Venice,

Liszt and Venice feature constantly in the work of this Italian pianist who was born in 1967 and who started studying the piano at the age of six, made his first public appearance aged eleven in Venice, the City of the Water, and was trained in the school of Liszt – the genius composer and performer who wrote many of his works in Venice hardly 100 meters from the very place of Ambrosini's birth.

Brenno Ambrosini, (Venice, 1967) began studying piano with M.I.Biagi (Venice and Florence) and R. Cappello (Parma), and also pursued organ, violin and composition studies with U. Amendola (Venice).

On completion of his studies in the grand tradition of the piano schools of Chopin, Liszt, Sgambati and Busoni, earning an Honours degree in piano awarded “cum laude” in recognition of his academic merits, he continued his training with G. Oppitz (a disciple of W. Kempff) in Munich in 1986–89, then went on to study further with M.de Silva-Telles (C.Arrau's pupil) in Paris 1989. In 1990 he continued his musical training with J.Soriano ( a disciple of M.Tagliaferro and V.Perlemuter) at the Royal Conservatory of Music in Madrid, where he was awarded the annual Honour Prize on completion of his course of studies. He completed his Ph.D. distinguished by the highest academic achievement and “cum laude” at the Jaume I University in Castellón (December 2015, Spain): “Ethics and Humanism in Franz Liszt”.
Having won public acclaim many a time for his interpretation and performances colourful and with moments of great transcendental depth, critics have said:
His Liszt sonata has been a sacred performance – a monumental interpretation (El País, Madrid - Spain)
His symphonic piano style shone at every performance. (Westfälische Rundschau, Dortmund - Germany)
The right choice, a pianist who is always elegant and refined. (Pianotime, Milan - Italy)

Winner at the XXXIV Concurso Internacional de Piano "Premio Jaén” and the  "Rosa Sabater Prize" for the best performance of Spanish music in the same election. Ambrosini won the First Prize, the Debussy Prize and the Beethoven Prize in the International Piano Competition "Cidade do Porto".  He was laureated in the X Concurso Internacional de Piano de Santander "Paloma O'Shea". Second Prize in the International Piano Competition "José Iturbi" of Valencia, he was awarded Second Prize and the "Golden Harp" Audience Award in the International Competition "Jeunesses Musicales" of Belgrade and won the “Piano Festival Alumni Prize” in the "William Kapell” International Piano Competition at College Park (Washington D.C., USA).

After his orchestral debut at the Liederhalle (Beethovensaal) of Stuttgart in 1986 performing the “Emperor” piano concerto by Beethoven, Ambrosini has performed many concerts as a soloist in cities in Europe, the US and Japan accompanied by ensembles such as the Royal Orchestra of Concertgebouw of Amsterdam, the Royal Philharmonic Orchestra, the Philharmonic Orchestra of Belgrade, the Scottish Chamber Orchestra, New Philharmonia of Japan, New Mozart Chamber in Munich, Orquesta do Porto, Valencia Symphony, Radio Television Symphony in Madrid and Belgrade, Slupsk Chopin Symphony, Bari Symphony Orchestra, Hermitage State Orchestra of St.Petersburg, Schnittke Symphonic in Moscow... performing with conductors such as M.Bamert, H.Vonk  and A.Ros-Marbá, I.Gromov...

In chamber music, he started in 1984 the collaboration with the cellist Claudio Ronco (cello soloist of the Clemencic Consort Wien and the Razumowsky Quartet). Since 1990 Ambrosini has performed in duets with the Russian violinist M. Lubotsky, since 1994 with a Dutch pianist David Kuyken and since 2002 with the Russian violinist I. Grubert. He also collaborates regularly with the Prazak and Brodsky string quartets and he played with Jean Pierre Rampal. Founder of the Kether Piano Trio, in 2014 he offered rounds of concerts as Tribute to Haydn, and he celebrated the 20 years anniversary of his piano duo with rounds of 4 recitals for pieces for two pianos .

Ambrosini has recorded CDs for Symphonia, Almaviva, ETG, Several and Dynamic record labels and has recorded for top European radio and television channels and for NHK of Japan. Special mention should be made of his collaboration with the Radio Clásica of Radio Nacional de España which has resulted in more than 350 recordings.

Composers such as H. Vartan, V. Suslin, R. Flender, S. Ikeda, F. Llácer-Pla, T. Catalán, C. Cruz de Castro, Z. de la Cruz, T. Marco, J. Jacinto, J. Medina, J. M. Sánchez-Verdú, C. Perón, C. Maresca, A. Meoli and G. F. Prato have dedicated works to Ambrosini. He also premiered works by composers such as A. Pärt, N. Roslawietz, S. Gubaidulina, S. Slonimsky, A. Bax, B. Britten and F. Delius in Spain. Special attention is due for his study of the works of Russian composer Alfred Schnittke: he has performed Schnittke's works in Europe, Russia and Japan and has offered Schnittke Master Classes at the London University and the Russische Musik Akademie de Dortmund. Ambrosini is an honorary member of the Deutsche Alfred Schnittke Gesellschaft.

Professor of various piano skill development courses in Spain, Italy, Germany, Austria, the United Kingdom (Goldsmiths College, University of London) and Poland, Ambrosini was a tenured professor at the Conservatorio Superior of Castellón and Professor at the Alfred Schnittke Akademie International of Hamburg (2011-2014). Now, Master Professor of Piano at the VIU – Valencia International University, Professor at the Internationales Konservatorium am Phoenix See (Dortmund), Ambrosini serves as a jury member at important international piano competitions (Belgrade, Hamburg, Valencia, Valladolid, Madrid, Carlet, Teruel...)

As a piano teacher, he organized a structured program for his class. The lessons are divided into three parts, one about the basics of pianistic technique (pure technique), one for the development of the technique basics (etudes and Bach, mainly), and one for building a piano recital repertoire plus two piano concertos. Apart, every year he includes two monographic programs for all his students around different themes (Sonatas, Suites, or different composers).

Currently he is a piano professor at the High Conservatory of Salamanca and at CSKG Madrid for Bachelor and Master (Spain) where he also develops the subject “Basics and foundations of piano technique: from the school of fingers to transcendental technique”, and he is a coordinator of the ExtraUE-Salamanca partnerships. Some of his most outstanding students are Iria San Marcial (Vigo), Arturo Grossi (Madrid) and Emilia Jiménez (Dos Hermanas).

In 2011, the year of Liszt, Ambrosini offered a series of recitals and performed with orchestras in Germany, France, Holland, Italy, Poland and Spain, and recorded a CD with the Sonata in B minor and a selection of Liszt's last works. In 2019 he launched the CD “Ad Astra” with the Beethoven's Op.111 Sonata and works by Webern and Stockhausen. He had a tour in Russia performing the Schnittke's Concerto, apart from Recitals, Masterclass and as jury of the “Schnittke Int. Competition”.

Projects for 2019 included the recording of Beethoven's piano Sonatas Op.53, 54 and 57, Masterclasses in Moscow, Ufa and Orenburg (Russia), Parma, Piacenza and Venice (Italy), Concertos with orchestra in Spain and Russia, and Recitals in Spain, Italy and Russia.

As organizer, Dr. Ambrosini has developed and led a range of projects, as follows:

2003: Founder of Bell´Arte Europa  International Cultural Society, promoting concerts, competitions, exhibitions, Festivals and interchanges between institutions from different countries
2006 till now: Artistic Director, Chairman and founder of the “Jóvenes Pianistas” International Competition in Spain
2010 till now: Artistic Director and founder of the “PGP” International Piano Competition for Young Talents
2011 till 2014: Artistic Director and founder of the ASAI International Piano Competition in Hamburg – Germany, with more than 40 competitors per year, and the ASAI Pianofest, where a special attention was dedicated to promote the contemporary music and to pay tribute to important personages such as A. Schnittke or G.Ligeti, for instance:
2012 – 2015: Director of the International Relationships Department of the Conservatorio Superior de Música de Castellón, at which together with the Erasmus+ Office he organized more than 180 agreements with European Conservatories, and around 30 masterclasses per year.

He regularly organizes International Piano Meetings for young talents in Italy and Germany (Dortmund, Avezzano, Campli, Lago di Bracciano) and from 2017 he is the coordinator of the International SalMos Festival (Salamanca – ExtraUE Academies), which takes place in Salamanca and ExtraUE every year. This project is a twinning between two conservatories (Salamanca and Moscow, Samara, etc...) with student exchanges and those of  professors. The last meeting in Salamanca amounted to five chamber music concerts, one symphonic concert, a meeting for composers, six masterclasses with more than 100 hours of lessons.

Council Advisor of the Franz Liszt Foundation (France), Member of the “Knights of the Thunderbolt” Association (Italy), “Pegasus” Association (Germany), “Club Renacimiento” (Madrid - Spain), “Club33” (Barcelona – Spain) and president of the “Asociación Piedra Franca” in Salamanca and “Círculo de Estudios Franz Liszt”.

Prizes 
 1988 - Cidade do Porto. 1st prize. Beethoven Prize. Debussy Prize.
 1988 - Jose Iturbi International Piano Competition. 2nd prize.
 1989 - Jeunesses Musicales International Music Competition - Belgrade - Second Prize and Audience Prize
 1990 - Paloma O'Shea Santander International Piano Competition. Finalist.
 1992 - Jaén International Piano Competition. 1st prize, Rosa Sabater prize.

References 

Living people
Year of birth missing (living people)
Italian classical pianists
Male classical pianists
Italian male pianists
Italian expatriates in Spain
José Iturbi International Piano Competition prize-winners
21st-century classical pianists
21st-century Italian male musicians